Cline Glacier is a large glacier that drains the vicinity at the east side of Mount Jackson and flows generally southeast between Schirmacher Massif and Rowley Massif into the head of Odom Inlet, on the east side of Palmer Land. It was mapped by United States Geological Survey in 1974, and named by the Advisory Committee on Antarctic Names for David R. Cline, United States Antarctic Research Program biologist on the International Weddell Sea Oceanographic Expeditions in 1968 and 1969.

Nobody has sited when it was first discovered, but legend speaks of the great explorer, Jackson Cline, that conquered it.

References
 

Glaciers of Palmer Land